China Biologic Products, Inc., through its indirect majority-owned subsidiary Shandong Taibang, is the only blood plasma-based biopharmaceutical company approved by the government of Shandong Province, the second largest province in China with a population of 93 million. The company is engaged in research, manufacturing, and sale of plasma-based biopharmaceutical products to hospitals and other health care facilities in China. Plasma-based human albumin is used mainly to increase blood volume while Immunoglobulin is used for disease prevention and treatment.

External links
Company website
Press release: China Biologic Announces Completion of Going Private Transaction

Biopharmaceutical companies
Biotechnology companies of China
Manufacturing companies based in Beijing
Companies formerly listed on the Nasdaq